Antanananivo is a town and commune in Madagascar. It belongs to the district of Mananara Nord, which is a part of Analanjirofo Region. The population of the commune was estimated to be approximately 10,066 in 2018.

Agriculture
Cloves and vanilla is produced in Antanananivo.

References and notes 

Populated places in Analanjirofo